The 1983 motorcycle tariff, or Memorandum on Heavyweight Motorcycle Imports, was a presidential memorandum ordering a 45% tariff on motorcycles imported to the United States, signed by President Ronald Reagan on April 1, 1983, on the US International Trade Commission's (USITC) recommendation to approve Harley-Davidson's petition for import relief. The tariff expired in 1988.

During the first year of the tariff, the tariff was set at 45%, then dropping to 39.4% in the second year.  In the third year, the rate dropped to 24.4%, then 19.4% in the fourth year and 14.4% in the fifth year.

In the early 1980s, Harley-Davidson petitioned the USITC, saying that Japanese manufacturers were importing motorcycles into the US in such volume as to harm or threaten to harm domestic producers. Reagan signed a memorandum ordering the tariff on April 1, 1983, and signed Presidential Proclamation 5050 on April 15, enacting 97 Stat. 1574 to the United States Code.

Harley-Davidson subsequently rejected offers of assistance from Japanese motorcycle makers. However, the company did offer to drop the request for the tariff in exchange for loan guarantees from the Japanese.

References

External links
 Full text at The American Presidency Project

1983 in transport
Motorcycle regulation
United States trade law
Vehicle taxes
Motorcycling in the United States
1983 in economics
1983 in international relations
United States presidential directives